Out of Gas is a 1992 action game developed by Realtime Associates for the Game Boy.

Gameplay
In this video game, the player's spaceship is out of gas. Eric and his unnamed girlfriend need to stop on certain tiles in order to refuel so they can return home from their date in outer space. This gas allows the celestial cruise to regain full power. However, these gas tanks must be collected in the proper numerical order or they cannot be used, similar to the gameplay found on the NES version of Fun House.

Shooting signs in a certain order is sometimes required to clear a level. Enemy tanks will also fire laser weapons from their sprinkler guns directly at the player; causing them to wildly evade them in order to escape destruction. There are 64 levels in this game to find gasoline and the game balances a mixture of space explorating, galactic action and cerebral puzzles.

Passwords allow players to resume the action at any time.

Reception
Allgame gave this video game a rating of 2.5 out of 5.

External links

Out of Gas at GameFAQs
Out of Gas at IGN

1992 video games
Action video games
Game Boy-only games
North America-exclusive video games
Realtime Associates games
Science fiction video games
Single-player video games
Video games developed in the United States
Video games set in outer space
Game Boy games